The 2023 International Bernese Ladies Cup was held from January 26 to 29 at Curling Bern in Bern, Switzerland as part of the World Curling Tour. The event was held in a round-robin format with a purse of 18,200 CHF.

Teams
The teams are listed as follows:

Round robin standings 
Final Round Robin Standings

Round robin results
All draw times listed in Central European Time (UTC+01:00).

Draw 1
Thursday, January 26, 7:30 pm

Draw 2
Friday, January 27, 9:00 am

Draw 3
Friday, January 27, 2:00 pm

Draw 4
Friday, January 27, 7:00 pm

Draw 5
Saturday, January 28, 9:00 am

Draw 6
Saturday, January 28, 2:00 pm

Playoffs

Source:

Quarterfinals
Saturday, January 28, 7:00 pm

Semifinals
Sunday, January 29, 9:00 am

Final
Sunday, January 29, 9:00 am

References

External links
Official Website
CurlingZone

Women's curling competitions in Switzerland
Sports competitions in Basel
2023 in Swiss sport
January 2023 sports events in Switzerland
Sports competitions in Bern